Listrocerum is a genus of longhorn beetles of the subfamily Lamiinae, containing the following species:

 Listrocerum aeolis (Thomson, 1857)
 Listrocerum apiceniger (Breuning, 1961)
 Listrocerum aspericorne Chevrolat, 1855
 Listrocerum asperipenne (Breuning, 1957)
 Listrocerum bicolor (Lepesme, 1950)
 Listrocerum fuscopicalis (Breuning, 1961)
 Listrocerum joveri (Quentin, 1951)
 Listrocerum maynei (Lepesme & Breuning, 1956)
 Listrocerum murphyi Adlbauer, 2004
 Listrocerum olseni (Lepesme & Breuning, 1956)
 Listrocerum psathyroides (Lepesme, 1950)
 Listrocerum quentini (Lepesme & Breuning, 1956)

References

Xystrocerini